Lemonia philopalus is a species of moth of the family Brahmaeidae (older classifications placed it in Lemoniidae). It is found from Spain up to Egypt and North Africa.

The moth flies from October to February depending on the location.

The larvae feed on Hieracium and Sonchus species.

Subspecies
Lemonia philopalus philopalus
Lemonia philopalus vasquezi Oberthür, 1916

Sources

P.C.-Rougeot, P. Viette (1978). Guide des papillons nocturnes d'Europe et d'Afrique du Nord. Delachaux et Niestlé (Lausanne).

External links
Lepiforum.de

Brahmaeidae
Moths described in 1842
Taxa named by Hugo Fleury Donzel